Zottelbach is a small river of Bavaria, Germany. It flows into the Saale near Issigau.

See also
List of rivers of Bavaria

References

 Höhe nach dem Höhenlinienbild auf dem Hintergrundlayer Amtliche Karte. Siehe bei den → Weblinks.
Länge abgemessen auf dem Hintergrundlayer Amtliche Karte

Rivers of Bavaria
Rivers of Germany